Gain is a property of a projection screen, and is one of the specifications quoted by projection screen manufacturers.

Interpretation 
The number that is typically measured is called the peak gain at zero degrees viewing axis, and represents the gain value for a viewer seated along a line perpendicular to the screen's viewing surface. The gain value represents the ratio of brightness of the screen relative to a set standard (in this case, a sheet of magnesium carbonate). Screens with a higher brightness than this standard are rated with a gain higher than 1.0, while screens with lower brightness are rated from 0.0 to 1.0. Since a projection screen is designed to scatter the impinging light back to the viewers, the scattering can either be highly diffuse or highly concentrated. Highly concentrated scatter results in a higher screen gain (a brighter image) at the cost of a more limited viewing angle (as measured by the half-gain viewing angle), whereas highly diffuse scattering results in lower screen gain (a dimmer image) with the benefit of a wider viewing angle.

Sources
 

Display technology